All Saints' Church, in Cellan is a Church in Wales parish church. The church is a Grade II* listed building with part of it dating back to the medieval period. It belongs to the United Benefice of Lampeter.

History 
All Saints' Church was built during the thirteenth or fourteenth centuries, possibly on top of a Bronze Age barrow, and is thought to have originally been dedicated to Saint Callwen. Another of its medieval features is its square-bowled font. The building has been subjected to minor changes throughout history, including several restorations. Its roof, once thatched, was replaced by slate in the seventeenth century. The presence of a medieval rood loft was recorded in 1810, but has since been removed - perhaps during the Victorian restoration of 1861–62.

Description 
The church is constructed of rubble stone and has a slate roof. It consists of a nave and chancel, both thought to date to the thirteenth or fourteenth centuries, a west bellcote by Herbert Luck North, a north vestry and south porch. Its interior has been described as "the only significant Arts and Crafts work in the county [of Ceredigion]." The ceilings - dating to North's restoration of 1908 - are boarded and painted white, and decorated with flowers and vines, with a symbolic lamb painted on the chancel ceiling.

Heritage Funding 
All Saints' Church received a Heritage Lottery Fund grant in 2018 in order to fund essential repairs to the building.

References 

Church in Wales
Church in Wales church buildings
Arts and Crafts movement
Ceredigion